The Latin Grammy Award for Best Female Pop Vocal Album was an honor presented annually at the Latin Grammy Awards from 2001 to 2011 The award was given to a female performer for albums containing at least 51 percent of new recordings of the pop genre. Since its inception, the award category has had several name changes. In 2000 was known as Best Female Pop Vocal Performance, being awarded for singles or tracks. The following year onwards the award for Best Female Pop Vocal Album was presented.

The award has been presented to singers originating from Canada, Colombia, Italy, Puerto Rico, Spain, and the United States. The award for Female Pop Vocal Performance at the 1st Latin Grammy Awards was earned by Colombian singer-songwriter Shakira for the song "Ojos Así". Shakira was also awarded Female Pop Vocal Album in 2006 for Fijación Oral Vol. 1 (which also received the Latin Grammy for Album of the Year) and in 2011 for her album Sale el Sol. In 2001, the award winners were announced at a press conference, since the 2nd Latin Grammy Awards were scheduled to take place on September 11, 2001. Christina Aguilera received the award for her first Spanish language album Mi Reflejo.

Recipients

2000s

2010s

 Each year is linked to the article about the Latin Grammy Awards held that year.

See also

 List of music awards honoring women
Grammy Award for Best Female Pop Vocal Performance
Latin Grammy Award for Best Male Pop Vocal Album
Latin Grammy Award for Best Pop Vocal Album, Duo or Group
Latin Grammy Award for Best Contemporary Pop Vocal Album
Latin Grammy Award for Best Traditional Pop Vocal Album

References

General
  Note: User must select the "Pop Field" category as the genre under the search feature.

Specific

External links
Official site of the Latin Grammy Awards

 
Music awards honoring women
Female Pop Vocal Album
Awards established in 2000
Awards disestablished in 2011
Female Pop Vocal Album
Female Pop Vocal Album